José Carlos Somoza Ortega (born 13 November 1959) is a Spanish author. He was born  in Havana, Cuba. In 1960 his family moved to Spain after being exiled for political reasons. His family proved to be in difficult financial situation after having moved to Spain 
because they had been forbidden to take anything along except their child. And there were a lot of friends who 
helped them a lot during their first years in Spain. He holds a Bachelor's Degree in psychiatry, but he gave up medicine in order to become a full-time writer in 1994. Since 1994 he made his first steps in writing and sent his works to the different literature competitions, to  magazines and publishers all over Spain. And his first book was published the same year. When his fifth novel The Cave of Ideas obtained an international acknowledge, he realized that he had chosen the right route in his life.

Works 
Planos (1994)
El silencio de Blanca (1996)
Miguel Will (1997)
Cartas de un asesino insignificante (1999)
La ventana pintada (1999)
La caverna de las ideas (2000; The Athenian Murders, 2002, shortlisted for the UK's Independent Foreign Fiction Prize, winner of the CWA Gold Dagger)
Dafne desvanecida (2000; shortlisted for Spain's Nadal Prize)
Clara y la penumbra (2001; The Art of Murder, 2004)
La dama número trece (2003)
 BOUCHE (LA) (10 October 2003)
La caja de marfil (2004)
El detalle (tres novelas breves) (2005)
The Art of Murder (2005)
Zig Zag (2006)
 La Caja de Marfil (Best Seller (Debolsillo)) (Spanish Edition) (2006)
 Dafne desvanecida (29 September 2006)
 La llave del abismo (The Key of Doom) (2007; Premio de Novela Ciudad de Torrevieja)
 La Theorie DES Cordes (French Edition) (16 September 2008)
 El Cebo (2010)
 Fantasmas de papel (Spanish Edition) (2010)
 La ventana pintada ( The Painted Window) (Spanish Edition) (1 May 2010)
 Tetrammeron: Los cuentos de Soledad (2012)
 Detalle, El (2013)
 La caverne des idées (Lettres hispaniques) (French Edition) (2014)
 Le Mystère Croatoan (ROMANS, NOUVELL) (French Edition)(3 January 2018)

Awards 
 The Second Gabriel Sijé Short Story Award for "Planes" (1994)
The Margarita Xirgu Prize for dramatic radio scripts, convened by Radio Exterior de España and the Ibero-American Cooperation Institute for his screenplay "Langostas" (1994)
The Cervantes Theater Award (INAEM) for his play "Miguel Will" (1997)
The Café Gijón Award for his novel "La ventana pintada" (1998)
Finalist for the Nadal Prize for his novel "Dafne Desvanecida" (2000)
Fernando Lara Novel Award for Clara y la penumbra (2001)
The Hammett Prize of black novel with "Clara and the penumbra" (2002)
The Macallan Gold Dagger For Fiction Award 2002, awarded by the Mystery Writers Association of the United Kingdom for his novel "The Cave of Ideas" (2002)
Flintyxan Award for the best historical police novel, awarded to "The Cave of Ideas" by the Association of Swedish Novel Writers (2004)
Special mention in the Premio Celsius 232 (to the best work of science fiction or fantasy of 2007 written in Spanish) for The key of the abyss in the 21 Black Week of Gijón

References

External links 
 
Book review – The Athenian Murders
A second review of The Athenian Murders from Salon

Spanish mystery writers
Spanish novelists
Spanish male novelists
Spanish medical writers
Spanish psychiatrists
Cuban emigrants to Spain
People from Havana
1959 births
Living people
Writers of historical mysteries